The following is a list of notable people from Telangana.

Award winners

Bharat Ratna
 Zakir Hussain

Padma Vibhushan

Ravi Narayana Reddy (1992)
Kaloji (1992)
Ali Yavar Jung
Mehdi Nawaz Jung

Padma Bhushan
 C. Narayanareddy
 Haroon Khan Sherwani
Nawab Zain Yar Jung
Zehra Ali Yavar Jung
C. H. Hanumantha Rao

Padma Shri Award 
Mohammad Ahmed Zaki, Service
Gajam Anjaiah, Arts
Sayyid Ahmedullah Qadri, Arts
Gopi Chand Mannam, Medicine
Laxma Goud, Arts

Dada Saheb Phalke Award 
Paidi Jairaj

Dronacharya Award

 Mohammad Ilyas Babar, athletics
 Syed Naeemuddin, football

Sahitya Akademi Award in Telugu

 Suravaram Pratap Reddy, for his social history book Andhrula Sanghika Charitamu (1955)
 Daasarathi Krishnamacharyulu, for his Timiramotho Samaram 1974
 Cingireddy Narayana Reddy, for his Mantalu Manavudu 1973

Education
 Prof. K. Venkata Ramiah, founder Vice-chancellor of Kakatiya University; former member of the UPSC
 Arjula Ramachandra Reddy, distinguished biologist; founder Vice-chancellor of Yogi Vemana University; Fellow of the Indian Academy of Sciences, Bangalore
 Chukka Ramaiah, MLC, educationist and Telangana activist

Business/Industrialists 
 Jupally Rameswar Rao, My Home group
 Sashi Reddi, AppLabs

Film industry

 Kanta Rao
 Vandemataram Srinivas
 Vijay Deverakonda
 Aditi Rao Hydari
 Nithiin
 C. Narayanareddy
 Chakri, composer
 Chandrabose
 Dasarathi Krishnamacharya
 Dil Raju
 Harish Shankar
 Nandini Reddy
 Nagesh Kukunoor, filmmaker and screenwriter
 Nikhil Siddharth
 Venu Madhav
 Udaya Bhanu
 Vennela Kishore
 Rahul Ramakrishna
 Priyadarshi
 Rahul Ramakrishna
 Sampath Nandi
 Shekhar Kammula
 Tharun Bhascker Dhaassyam
 Sandeep Reddy Vanga
 Nag Ashwin
 Siva Reddy
 Thagubothu Ramesh
 Shashi Preetam, music director
 Suddala Ashok Teja
 Shyam Benegal
 Shabana Azmi
 Vamshi Paidipally
 Surender ReddyM. Prabhakar Reddy
 N.Shankar
 Farah Naaz
 Tabassum Hashmi
 Dia Mirza Handrich
 Sampoornesh Babu
 Dasharath
 Sushmita Sen
 Tanishq Reddy
 Kiran Rao
 B. Narsing Rao
 Rajnesh Domalpalli, Telugu film director
 Sankalp Reddy
 Rahul Sipligunj
 Paidi Jairaj
 Reshma Rathore
 Madhura Sreedhar Reddy

Poets
 Kancherla Gopanna or Bhakta Ramadasu
 Palkuriki Somanna
 Bammera Pothana, one of the most acclaimed Telugu poets
 Krishnamacharyulu Dasaradhi (1925–1987), poet and political activist
 Kaloji Narayana Rao (1914–2002), poet and political activist
 C. Narayanareddy, Padma Shri and Padma Bhushan award recipient
 Dasaradhi Rangacharya
 Chandrabose
 Suddala Hanmanthu, poet, best known for the Telugu folk song "Palletoori Pillagada"
 Goreti Venkanna, poet and folk singer
 Rasamayi Balakrishna, folk singer, poet and political activist
 Ampasayya Naveen
 Bulemoni Venkateshwarlu
 Sunkireddy Narayana Reddy
 Gaddar, Singer
 Gummadi Vittal Rao, balladeer and Naxalite activist
 Pamulaparthi Sadasiva Rao
 Suddala Hanmanthu
 Suddala Ashok Teja
 Suravaram Pratapareddy
 Vajjala Shiva Kumar
 Varavara Rao
 Vattikota AlwarSwamy
 Gona Budda Reddy
 Waheed Akhtar,  Urdu poet, writer and one of the leading Muslim scholars and philosophers of the 20th century
 Mallinātha Sūri
 Agasthya Kavi
 Andesri
 Fani Badayuni, noted Urdu poet
 Maharaja Sir Kishen Pershad, Urdu poet
 Nandini Sidda Reddy

Politicians 
P. V. Narasimha Rao, ex-CM of AP and ninth Prime Minister of India
Sarojini Naidu, first Indian woman to become the president of the Indian National Congress and the first woman governor (to United Provinces)
 Zakir Hussain, third President of India and former governor of Bihar*Padmaja Naidu, founder of INC in the Hyderabad State, former governor of West Bengal
Burgula Ramakrishna Rao, first elected Chief Minister of the Hyderabad State (Independent India)
Marri Chenna Reddy, ex-CM of Andhra Pradesh
Jalagam Vengal Rao, ex-CM of Andhra Pradesh
Tanguturi Anjaiah, ex-CM of Andhra Pradesh
 Kalvakuntla Chandrashekar Rao, Chief Minister of Telangana State; founder of TRS;
 Bandi Sanjay, MP and BJP Telanagana Chief
 Bandaru Dattatreya, Governor of Himachal Pradesh from 2019, ex-MP Sec-bad
 Jaipal Reddy, ex-MP (13th, 14th and 15th Lokh Sabha); Minister, GOI
 Naini Narshimha Reddy, ex-Home Minister of Telangana, MLC, TRS Party Senior Leader
 Sabita Indra Reddy, Education Minister of Telangana from 2019
 R. Krishnaiah, MLA, national backward caste president; officially announced CM candidate from TDP party
 Suravaram Sudhakar Reddy, ex-MP, former General Secretary for the Communist Party of India
 Renuka Chowdhury, former Union minister of State and member of numerous parliamentary committees
 Alimineti Madhava Reddy, ex-Home Minister of Andhra Pradesh
 P. Shiv Shankar, ex-MP, Union Law Minister - GOI
 G. Sanjeeva Reddy, ex-MP Rajya Sabha, Ex-Minister of labour
 G. Venkat Swamy, ex-MP (14th Lok Sabha); ex-Minister, GOI
 Linganna Pujari, Mumbai
 Ponnala Lakshmaiah, President, Telangana Pradesh Congress Committee; ex-Minister of AP
 Tadur Bala Goud, Champion of the Backward Class community; former Minister, MLA; twice an MP in 8th and 9th Lok Sabha
 V. Srinivas Goud, MLA, AP
 Bandaru Dattatreya, MP (Lok Sabha) and Minister, GOI
 P. Muralidhar Rao, National General Secretary, BJP
 Ponnam Prabhakar Goud, ex-MP (15th Lok Sabha)
 Manda Jagannadham, MP (15th Lok Sabha)
 Ramesh Rathod, ex-MP (15th Lok Sabha)
 Gutha Sukender Reddy, Chairman of Telangana Legislative Council from 2019
 Komatireddy Raj Gopal Reddy, ex-MP (15th Lok Sabha)
 Sabita Indra Reddy, ex-Minister, Andhra Pradesh
 Komatireddy Venkat Reddy, ex-minister, AP
 Kunduru Jana Reddy, ex-Minister Panchayat Raj (2010), AP
 Madan Mohan, MLA
 K. T. Rama Rao, MLA
 T. Harish Rao, MLA
 K. Kavitha, MP; founder and President of Telangana Jagruthi Samithi
 G. Kishan Reddy, MLA, President of the BJP, AP
 Marri Shashidhar Reddy, MLA, member of the National Disaster Management Authority
 Etela Rajender, MLA
 Kadiyam Srihari, MP
 Konda Surekha, MLA, ex-Minister, AP
Nagabhairava Jaya Prakash Narayana, founder of Lok Satta Party
 Ramreddy Damodar Reddy, MLA
 Mallu Bhatti Vikramarka, MLA, Chief Whip for the Congress Party
 Chukka Ramaiah, Ramaiah Academy, Educationalist, MLC
 G. Vivekanand, ex-MP (15th Lok Sabha)
 Revanth Reddy, MP, Malkajgiri
 R. Krishnaiah, MLA, National backward caste president; officially announced CM candidate from TDP
 Asaduddin Owaisi, MP, President Of AIMIM
 Akbaruddin Owaisi, MLA, Floor Leader in Telangana Assembly from AIMIM
 C.Laxma Reddy, MLA Jadcherla, ex-Health Minister

Sport

Badminton 

 Pullela Gopichand
 Jwala Gutta
 Parupalli Kashyap
 Saina Nehwal
 P.V. Sindhu

Cricketers 

 Shivlal Yadav, former India team player
  M. L. Jaisimha, Team India cricket player
 V. V. S. Laxman
 Ambati Rayudu
 Pragyan Ojha
 Mithali Raj
 Harsha Bhogle, popular cricket commentator and founder of cricbuzz.com
 Kanwaljit Singh, multiple Ranji record-breaking all-rounder
 Arshad Ayub, former India team player and manager
 Mohammad Azharuddin
 Abbas Ali Baig, player and coach of India Cricket Team
 Noel David, former Team India cricketer
 Mohammed Siraj, represented Team India in cricket

Hockey players 

 Mukesh Kumar

Other sports 

 Gagan Narang - shooter
 Abdul Basith - former captain of the Indian Men's Volleyball Team
 Nikhat Zareen - boxer
 Sania Mirza - Tennis player

News writers 

 Vattikota Alwar Swamy (1915–1961), Telugu writer, human rights activist, communist leader, journalist and publisher
 Suravaram Pratapareddy (1896–1953), social historian
 Suddala Ashok Teja, Tollywood lyric writer
 Arunodaya Vimala, balladeer and social activist

Military chiefs 
 Air Chief Marshal Idris Hasan Latif, Chief of Staff, Indian Air Force, 1978–81
 Air Chief Marshal Denis La Fontaine, Chief of Staff, Indian Air Force, 1985–88
 Air Chief Marshal Fali Homi Major, Chief of Staff, Indian Air Force, 2007–09

Religious figures 
 Kancherla Gopanna

Lawyers 
 Subodh Markandeya, Senior Advocate of the Supreme Court of India.

Other notable people 
 Chakali Ailamma, revolutionary leader
 Komaram Bheem, 20th-century freedom fighter
 Chukka Ramaiah, educator
 Prof. Kothapalli Jayashankar,  Professor and political activist
 Prof. M. Kodandaram, Professor, political activist, and chairman of All-Party Telangana Joint Action Committee
 Kalvakuntla Kavitha, political activist, founder and President of Telangana Jagruthi Samithi
 Suddala Hanumanthu, freedom fighter, writer, balladeer
 Malik Motasim Khan, leader of Jamaat-e-Islami Hind
 V. Prakash, educational activist
 Bholekar Srihari, painter, sculptor and printmaker
 Suresh Venapally, Indian mathematician known for his research work in algebra, Shanti Swarup Bhatnagar Award 2009
 Gaddar, artist, singer, politician
 Varavara Rao, poet
 Ganapathi, leader of the banned extremist group CPI (Maoist)
 Raavi Narayana Reddy, revolutionary, leader of CPI, parliamentarian
 Diya Mirza, former Miss Asia-Pacific pageant winner
 Vivek Oberoi, Hindi film actor
 Tabu, Hindi film actress, multiple national awards winner
 Vani Kola, venture capitalist, co-founder of Kalaari Capital
 Nerella Venu Madhav, often regarded as the father of Indian mimicry

See also
 Jaya Jaya He Telangana
 Telangana Language Day

References

Telangana
P